This is a list of magistrates of the former Kaohsiung County:

See also
 Kaohsiung County
 Kaohsiung
 List of mayors of Kaohsiung

Kaohsiung